Send In the Dogs Australia is an Australian documentary television series about the work of police dogs. first aired on Nine Network on 13 February 2011.  The second season aired from 12 October 2011 to the present.

References

Nine Network original programming
2011 Australian television series debuts
English-language television shows